The Marga is a left tributary of the river Bistra in Romania. It discharges into the Bistra in Vama Marga.

References

Rivers of Romania
Rivers of Caraș-Severin County